A Blackbird in Silver is a novel by Freda Warrington published in 1986.

Plot summary
A Blackbird in Silver is a novel in which a quest is undertaken, involving spaceships and astronomy, and mystical mental powers.

Reception
Dave Langford reviewed A Blackbird in Silver for White Dwarf #75, and stated that "The writing spins out a huge ever-increasing trilogy. Beam me up, Scotty."

Reviews
Review by Pauline Morgan (1986) in Fantasy Review, May 1986

References

1986 novels